The lateral posterior nucleus is a nucleus of the thalamus.

It acts in concert with the pulvinar.

In rodents, the lateral posterior nucleus is considered the homologue of the primate pulvinar.

References

External links
 http://brainmaps.org/index.php?y=lateral+posterior+nucleus+of+thalamus

Pulvinar nuclei
Lateral nuclei of the thalamus